Evolution is the second album by session guitarist Dennis Coffey and the Detroit Guitar Army.

Reception

Released in 1971 under the Dennis Coffey and the Detroit Guitar Band banner the album charted at number thirteen on the Top Soul Albums chart due to the funk instrumental "Scorpio" which charted at number six on the U.S. Pop Singles chart and number nine on the US Soul Singles chart.

Track listing 
All tracks composed by Dennis Coffey; except where indicated
"Getting It On" (Dennis Coffey, Mike Theodore) (2:31)
"Whole Lot of Love" (Jimmy Page, John Bonham, John Paul Jones, Robert Plant) (2:33)
"Summertime Girl" (3:06)
"Scorpio" (4:20)
"Garden of the Moon" (3:23)
"Impressions Of" (4:48)
"Sad Angel" (3:40)
"Big City Funk" (Dennis Coffey, Mike Theodore) (2:55)
"Wind Song" (2:44)
"Good Time Rhythm and Blues" (2:44)

Personnel 
Dennis Coffey - alto guitar, sitar
Joe Podorsek - baritone guitar
Ray Monette - tenor guitar
Bob Babbitt - bass guitar
Uriel Jones, Pistol Allen - drums
Earl Van Dyke - keyboards
Eddie "Bongo" Brown - congas
Jack Ashford - tambourine

Charts

Singles

Samples & Covers
Public Enemy sampled "Getting It On" on their song "You're Gonna Get Yours" on their album Yo! Bum Rush the Show in 1987.
Public Enemy sampled "Scorpio" on their song "Night of the Living Baseheads" on their album It Takes a Nation of Millions to Hold Us Back in 1988.
LL Cool J sampled "Scorpio" on his song "Jingling Baby" on his album Walking with a Panther in 1989.
Queen Latifah sampled "Scorpio" on her song "Mama Gave Birth To The Soul Children" on her album All Hail the Queen in 1989.
Young MC sampled "Scorpio" on his song "Bust a Move" on his album Stone Cold Rhymin' in 1989.
Geto Boys sampled "Scorpio" on their song "Do it Like a G.O." on their albums Grip It! On That Other Level in 1989 and The Geto Boys in 1990.
Lord Finesse & DJ Mike Smooth sampled "Scorpio" on their song "Keep It Flowing" on their album Funky Technician in 1990.
House of Pain sampled "Scorpio" on their song "All My Love" on their album House of Pain in 1992.

External links
 Dennis Coffey-Evolution at Discogs

References

1971 albums
Dennis Coffey albums
Sussex Records albums